Calbindin 1 is a protein that in humans is encoded by the CALB1 gene. It belongs to the calbindin family of calcium-binding proteins, along with calretinin (CALB2).

Function

The protein encoded by this gene is a member of the calcium-binding protein superfamily that includes calmodulin and troponin C. Originally described as a 27 kDa protein, it is now known to be a 28 kDa protein. It contains four active calcium-binding domains, and has two modified domains that are thought to have lost their calcium binding capability. This protein is thought to buffer entry of calcium upon stimulation of glutamate receptors. Depletion of this protein was noted in patients with Huntington disease. [provided by RefSeq, Jan 2015].

References

Further reading